Sara Peery Kyle (born October 21, 1952) is an American attorney and politician, and currently represents the 30th district in the Tennessee Senate. She became the second woman to elected to statewide office in Tennessee when she won the race for Public Service Commissioner in 1994. Kyle has been a member of the Senate since the 109th Tennessee General Assembly

Life 
Kyle was born in 1952 to Bruce and Emma Gene Clement Peery of Dickson, Tennessee and was a 1970 graduate of Dickson High School. She is the niece of Frank G. Clement, who served as governor, and Anna Belle Clement O’Brien, who was a state senator. She is married to Jim Kyle.

Career 
Kyle was elected to the Public Service Commission in 1994.  The PSC as an elected position was eliminated and replaced by the appointed Tennessee Regulatory Authority to which Kyle was appointed in 1996 by then Democratic Speaker Jimmy Naifeh. Kyle was reappointed to successive terms by Tennessee political leaders serving in appointed capacity from 1996 until March 2013 when she resigned, in protest, saying changes made by the Republican Governor Bill Haslam left the agency ineffective. Kyle briefly considered another effort at a statewide race in 2014 against Governor Haslam, but decided against this course of action.

In 2014 she was elected for an interim 2-year period of the remaining term to represent 30th district in the Tennessee Senate, which is composed of part of Memphis, after her husband retired from the seat mid-term. She won re-election to the state senate in 2016, running unopposed in the general election.

On 4 April 2016, Kyle voted for HB0615, a bill that would designate the Bible as the official state book. The bill, supported by a majority of the state's Republican senators and one other Democratic senator, was vetoed by Gov. Bill Haslam.
On 2 February 2019, Kyle proposed bill SB1320 on Arrests and bill SB1317 on Child Custody and Support and they were both passed.

References

External links
 The State Senate biography of Sara Kyle
 Project Vote Smart

1952 births
Living people
Democratic Party Tennessee state senators
Women state legislators in Tennessee
21st-century American politicians
21st-century American women politicians
People from Dickson, Tennessee
Politicians from Memphis, Tennessee
Nashville School of Law alumni